Stantonbury is a district and civil parish of Milton Keynes, Buckinghamshire, England. The toponym Stanton is derived from an Old English term for "stone-built farmstead" and the bury element from the French family  who held it in 1235. The original Stantonbury is a deserted medieval village now known as Stanton Low; the Stantonbury name has been reused for the modern district at the heart of the civil parish.

Civil parish
As well as Stantonbury itself, the civil parish of Stantonbury includes the districts of Bancroft and Bancroft Park, Blue Bridge, Bradville and Linford Wood. The population of the parish of Stantonbury grew from 19 at the 1971 census to 3,938 according to the 1981 census. By the time of the 2001 census its population had reached 9,010. At the 2011 census, it had 10,084 people.

Bancroft 
 
The residential Bancroft district is divided by Shenley Brook into Bancroft Park to the north and Bancroft to the south. The brook valley here is part of the flood control system and is a linear park for the most of the year. There is a permanent wetland with associated plants and wildlife.

The foundations of a Romano-British farm known as Bancroft Roman Villa are in what is now the North Loughton Park, overlooking the Shenley Brook. Rescue excavations in 1957 identified a group of perhaps four buildings, traces of a hypocaust and sherds of Iron Age pottery. A section of mosaic flooring recovered from the site is in the "guest services lounge" of Central Milton Keynes shopping centre.

A copy of the famous Concrete Cows sculpture is at the southern end of the park (the original is in the Milton Keynes Museum). The Cows were originally sited here.

Bancroft is a haven for birds and one of the best places to see a common kingfisher. This is because of the wide variety of habitats the Parks Trust has created, from old grassland managed as wildflower meadows, through patches of thorn scrub to extensive marsh. cowslips and salad burnet flower in the spring, followed in summer to the customary flowers of traditional hay meadow: lady's bedstraw and birdsfoot trefoil.

Bancroft pétanque Piste, which is near the Roman villa site, is provided by the Parks Trust free of charge. Also known as boules, pétanque is a traditional game played with steel balls on any sandy or gravelly surface across a large part of Europe.

The Bancrofts comprise just half the H2/H3/V5/V6 grid square, which is divided by the West Coast Main Line; the line is also the parish boundary, with Stacey Bushes (in Wolverton and Greenleys parish) on the other side of the tracks. Monks Way (H3, A422) bounds the parish from the neighbouring Bradwell.

Blue Bridge
This small district is mainly residential, near the West Coast Main Line and the Grand Union Canal (which separates it from Stonebridge, the rest of the grid square). It is also home to its own residential club, which it shares with Bancroft Park. The 'Blue Bridge' (18345), now restricted to pedestrian and cycle traffic, is one of the oldest bridges over the West Coast Main Line and is a Grade II listed structure.

Bradville

This district, between Bradwell, New Bradwell and Stantonbury itself, is mainly residential. The windmill is a Grade II listed building.

Linford Wood
As well as the ancient woodland that gives it its name, this district is mainly for high-tech industry. It is best known in Milton Keynes as the site of the telecommunications tower, for which it was chosen for its high elevation. It was originally part of the Linford demesne.

Oakridge Park
This small district of private housing development, part of the northern expansion of Milton Keynes outside its 1967 designated boundary, dates from about 2010. There is a small local centre with an Asda supermarket, a pharmacy and other small shops.

Stantonbury
This district lies north of Central Milton Keynes, between Great Linford and Wolverton, and south of Oakridge Park. It is largely residential, but the greater proportion of the area is taken up by two secondary schools (Stantonbury School and the Webber Independent School), a Theatre, leisure centre with a 25m swimming pool and an all-weather, competition standard, athletics track.

Modern Stantonbury lies on land historically known as "Stanton High" (as opposed to "Stanton Low").

Stanton Low
Stanton Low lies near the River Great Ouse and is the deserted village of historic Stantonbury,  one of the rural Buckinghamshire villages that were included in the area designated in 1967 to become Milton Keynes. Today this is an uninhabited agricultural area near the river Great Ouse. Little if anything remains of the deserted village other than the ruins of the parish church of St Peter. In the late 1950s the ruins of a Roman villa were discovered here, but were completely destroyed by gravel extraction.

Church of St Peter
The former Church of England parish church of Saint Peter in Stanton Low  is Norman, with a mid-12th century nave and even earlier chancel. There was a squint in the south wall of the chancel, but this was later blocked. St. Peter's was extensively rebuilt in the 13th century; the Decorated Gothic east window and piscina were added in the 14th century. By the latter part of the 17th century Stantonbury was an almost deserted but the church was still in use; between 1668 and 1674 the Puritan poet and hymnwriter John Mason was its parish priest. In 1736 only four houses remained in the village, but St Peter's was still in use in 1927 and John Piper painted a watercolour of it in about 1940. By 1955 the church had been disused for a number of years; the following year the roof collapsed. and was not repaired. By 1973 St. Peter's was a ruin, and the east window and ornamented Norman chancel arch had been removed (in 1963, to the Church of St James in New Bradwell.) The building is a Grade II listed building.

Because the civil parish boundary runs along the canal, St Peter's is actually in Haversham-cum-Little Linford civil parish.

References

Sources

External links
 Stantonbury Brass
 Running track

Villages in Buckinghamshire
Areas of Milton Keynes
Civil parishes in Buckinghamshire